Chris Winter may refer to:
 Chris Winter (athlete) (born 1986), Canadian 3,000 meter steeplechase runner 
 Chris Winter (television presenter) (born 1989), Australian television presenter for Network Ten
 Chris Winter (American football) American college football coach